William Wilson (1832—1903) was a politician in Queensland, Australia. He was a Member of the Queensland Legislative Council.

Politics
William Wilson was appointed to the Queensland Legislative Council on 2 January 1874. Although a lifetime appointment, his seat was declared vacant on 6 June 1878.

Personal life
He died in Brisbane in 1903 and was buried in Toowong Cemetery.

See also
 Members of the Queensland Legislative Council, 1870–1879

References

Members of the Queensland Legislative Council
1832 births
1903 deaths
Burials at Toowong Cemetery
19th-century Australian politicians